Libya–Serbia relations are diplomatic relations between Libya and Serbia. Libya has an embassy in Belgrade and Serbia has an embassy in Tripoli.

History

Muammar Gaddafi built a strong diplomatic relationship with Yugoslavia and then maintained it with Serbia.

One of the more important connections was the arms trade, first between the Socialist Federal Republic of Yugoslavia and Libya, and then continuing with Serbia after the breakup of Yugoslavia. Several aircraft of the Libyan Jamahiriyan Air Force which were captured or used to defend Gaddafi-loyalists were made by Yugoslav aircraft-manufacturer SOKO in present-day Bosnia and Herzegovina. Muammar Gaddafi maintained strong diplomatic with Serbia after Yugoslavia broke up in 1991-1995. Public opinion in Serbia has been cited to be supportive of the Muammar Gaddafi regime.

Libyan civil war
On August 25, 2011, Serbia officially recognized the National Transitional Council as the ruling government in Libya. However, the relations with the transitional government were strained from the very beginning of the Libyan Civil War when five Serbs were captured by Anti-Gaddafi rebels under the suspicion that they fought as mercenaries for Muammar Gaddafi. As of April 2012 all five still remained in detainment in Libya. Libya al Youm then reported that more mercenaries had been flown in from Banja Luka. The Serbian minister of defence, Dragan Sutanovac, denied reports that Serbian warplanes had bombed anti-Qaddafi protestors.

Post-civil war
On 7 November 2015 two Serbian embassy workers in Libya were kidnapped by an unknown group, as reported by the Serbian foreign ministry.

See also 
 Foreign relations of Libya
 Foreign relations of Serbia
 Libya–Yugoslavia relations
 Yugoslavia and the Non-Aligned Movement
 Yugoslavia and the Organisation of African Unity

References

External links 
  Serbian Ministry of Foreign Affairs about relations with Libya
  Serbian Ministry of Foreign Affairs: direction of the Serbian embassy in Tripoli
  Serbian Ministry of Foreign Affairs: direction of the Libya embassy in Belgrade

 
Serbia
Bilateral relations of Serbia